Iskoleta Man Awa is a 2019 Sri Lankan Sinhala children's drama film directed by Prasad Samarathunga and produced by Sandun Dolamulla. It stars Udith Abeyrathna, Kumara Wanduressa and Edna Sugathapala in lead roles along with Rajitha Hiran and Upul Weerasinghe. Child artist Viraj Madushan plays the main protagonist. Music composed by Udara Samaraweera. It is the 1328th Sri Lankan film in the Sinhala cinema.

The film is notable for starring veteran actress Edna Sugathapala, who returned to film after a decade-long hiatus/retirement. Sugathapala died in May 2018, prior to the film's premiere.

The film consists with only one song, which is sing by Kusal Weeramanthri and lyrics by Sankha Samarappuli.

Plot

Sukiri is a helpless boy. He lives with his grandmother. At one point he sneaks into the school at a time when he can no longer control that desire. Eventually the school disciplinary teacher captures Sukiri and takes it to the principal.

When the principal hears Sukiri's details, he feels sorry for him. So the principal tells Sukiri to come with a guardian. Sukiri immediately comes looking for her grandmother. But the end has not yet stopped the search for Sukiri. All his hopes were dashed when he saw his grandmother die of a heart attack the same day. He begins to make a living by selling solitary candy books. Meanwhile, he accidentally meets the school principal on the road.

Sukira's fate changes at that moment. Recognizing him, the principal brings Sukiri to his house. The principal treats Sukiri like a child. That was due to the loss of children to his family. However, the principal's wife, Sukiri, is also abusive and blames the principal.

Someone in this house is special to Sukiri. She is the mother of the principal's wife. Her hands are paralyzed from a rare disease. Sukiri remembers his grandmother every time she sees him. The principal's wife's mother is worried about her hands becoming paralyzed. That's where Sukiri's hidden talents begin to emerge.

With the help of the principal, Sukiri develops his knowledge and begins to develop a device that can restore the hands of the principal's wife's mother. It's a joke to others in the house, but Sukiri does not stop. As a result, Sukiri is involved in an unforeseen event. Eventually he has to go to a place he never expected.

Cast
 Viraj Madhushan Sukiri
 Udith Abeyrathne as grown-up Sukiri
 Kumara Wanduressa as School Principal Dahanayake
 Edna Sugathapala as Principal's mother
 Rajitha Hiran as Banda
 Roshana Ondaatje as Principal's wife
 Upul Weerasinghe as Hapuwa
 Theja Nadeeshani as Teacher
 Samanthi Lanerole as Granny
 Rohan Paul as Doctor
 Jayatissa Athulasiri as Disciplinary teacher
 Jagath Apaladeniya as Book shop worker
 Aruna Dhammika
 Thiraj Dewmina
 Shayni Rochana as Announcer
 Kusal Weeramanthri
 Denura Weerasinghe
 Nimna Warshana

References

External links
 
 Iskoleta Man Awa on YouTube

2019 films
2010s Sinhala-language films